Sir Ironside may refer to:
 The Red Knight in the story of Gareth, a character in Arthurian legend
 A King Arthur class locomotive